Teviston may refer to:

Teviston, former name of Bowie, Arizona
Teviston, California